The 2010 Le Mans Series was the seventh season of Automobile Club de l'Ouest's Le Mans Series.  It featured five events between 11 April and 12 September 2010. For the first time in 2010, Formula Le Mans (FLM) cars were run in a fifth class in the series, running alongside Le Mans Prototype cars and GT cars, rather than as a support series. It was also the final season when GT1 cars were allowed to run in the series.

Stéphane Sarrazin won the LMP1 championship despite sharing his car with Nicolas Lapierre for most of the season; Sarrazin did not run with his usual Team Oreca Matmut outfit at the 1000 km of Spa, instead gaining championship points with his Peugeot Sport teammates in a precursor to the 24 Hours of Le Mans the following month. Despite this, Sarrazin won only one race, winning at the 1000 km of Algarve with Lapierre and Olivier Panis. Lapierre was second ahead of Rinaldo Capello, who won at Paul Ricard with Allan McNish. Other class victories went to Sébastien Bourdais, Pedro Lamy and Simon Pagenaud at Spa, Greg Mansell and Leo Mansell at the Hungaroring, and Nicolas Minassian and Anthony Davidson at Silverstone. In LMP2, Thomas Erdos and Mike Newton claimed the championship for the second time, after their more consistent finishes helped them to fend off Strakka Racing's Jonny Kane, Danny Watts and Nick Leventis, who won three races to one for Erdos and Newton. The only other win was taken by Miguel Amaral and Olivier Pla at Spa.

The GT1 championship went to Larbre Compétition pairing Gabriele Gardel and Patrice Goueslard, as they were the only team to attempt every race in the championship. Julien Canal and Fernando Rees joined them in various races but were not a factor in the championship. The only team to beat Larbre during the season was the Marc VDS Racing Team car of Eric De Doncker, Bas Leinders and Markus Palttala, who won at Spa. GT2 proceedings saw a second successive title for Felbermayr-Proton duo Marc Lieb and Richard Lietz, winning three of the season's five races. The other two were taken by AF Corse duo Gianmaria Bruni and Jaime Melo at Algarve and at Silverstone. Another tight championship battle was fought out in the Formula Le Mans class, with DAMS' Andrea Barlesi and Gary Chalandon holding off Hope Polevision Racing driver Steve Zacchia by just two points. The season's five races were shared between four different entries, with Barlesi and Chalandon only winning at the Hungaroring with Alessandro Cicognani. Zacchia won at Spa with Wolfgang Kaufmann and Luca Moro, Damien Toulemonde, Ross Zampatti and David Zollinger won at Paul Ricard, while Jody Firth and Warren Hughes won twice, in the Algarve, and at Silverstone.

Schedule
On 27 October 2009 the ACO released a preliminary calendar for the 2010 season featuring three named events and two unconfirmed events, plus the traditional pre-season test session at Circuit Paul Ricard.  The calendar was further revised with two additional events at the Autódromo Internacional do Algarve and the Hungaroring.  The Paul Ricard race was also extended to eight hours in length.  The 1000 km of Silverstone was also the part of the inaugural Le Mans Intercontinental Cup for LMP1s, and it was also the first time that the race had been run on the circuit's "Arena" configuration.

Except for the 8 Hours of Castellet, as the name implied an eight-hour time limit, all races ran for either 1000 km or six hours, whichever came first; partially wet weather and a red flag period caused the 2010 1000 km of Spa to run slightly less than the 143 laps it was originally scheduled; the top three finishers completed 139 laps at the end of six hours. The 2010 1000 km of Hungaroring race was also run at a distance shorter than the 1000-km scheduled distance after six hours.

Season results
Overall winner in bold.

Championship Standings
Points were awarded to all race finishers, with unclassified entries failing to complete 70% of the race distance or entries failing to reach the finish not earning championship points. One bonus point was awarded for winning pole position (denoted by bold), and a further bonus was awarded for the entry which sets the fastest race lap (denoted by parenthesis).  Entries which changed an engine prior to the required two race minimum were penalized two points, with a four-point penalty for every subsequent engine change.

Points were allocated in one of two ways, dependent on race length.

Teams Championships
The top two finishers in the LMP1, LMP2 and GT2 championships earned automatic entry to the 2011 24 Hours of Le Mans, provided that the team was running for the full season. Partial season entries (teams that run on a part-time basis, e.g. race-by-race) were not eligible for automatic entries for the 24 Hours of Le Mans.

GT1 championships were not awarded any automatic entries as the GT1 category was phased out by the end of the year (see New 2011 regulations section).

LMP1 Standings

LMP2 Standings

FLM Standings 
All teams in the Formula Le Mans category utilized the Oreca FLM09 chassis and General Motors 6.3 L V8.

GT1 Standings

GT2 Standings

Drivers Championships

LMP1 Standings

LMP2 Standings

FLM Standings

GT1 Standings

GT2 Standings

References

External links
 Le Mans Series

 
Le Mans Series
European Le Mans Series seasons
European Le Mans Series